Mediacorp Channel 8's television series The Gentlemen is a family drama series produced by Mediacorp Studios in 2016. Three brothers with characteristics that trumpet the belief that men are from Mars are forced to understand the work discrimination that womenfolk face in their everyday jobs when they take on occupations that are perceived to be more feminine in nature i.e., a confinement nanny, ballet teacher and lingerie designer.

The show will begin airing on Mediacorp Channel 8 on 9 August 2016 with 20 episodes.

Episodic Guide

See also
List of MediaCorp Channel 8 Chinese Drama Series (2010s)
The Gentlemen

Lists of Singaporean television series episodes